Júlio César Coelho de Moraes Júnior (born 15 June 1982 in São Paulo), best known as Júlio César, is a Brazilian former footballer who played as a defender.

Júlio César joined Fluminense in December 2009; the team bought him from Cruzeiro (50%) and Goiás.

Honours

Club
Flamengo
 Taça Guanabara: 2004
 Rio de Janeiro State League: 2004

Cruzeiro
 Minas Gerais State League: 2006

Goiás
 Goiás State League: 2009

Fluminense
 Campeonato Brasileiro Série A: 2010

Botafogo
Campeonato Carioca: 2013

Vasco da Gama
Campeonato Carioca: 2016

Individual
 Campeonato Brasileiro Série A Team of the Year: 2009

References

External links
 

1982 births
Living people
Brazilian footballers
América Futebol Clube (RN) players
Bangu Atlético Clube players
Associação Desportiva Cabofriense players
Cruzeiro Esporte Clube players
CR Flamengo footballers
Marília Atlético Clube players
Clube Náutico Capibaribe players
Goiás Esporte Clube players
Fluminense FC players
Grêmio Foot-Ball Porto Alegrense players
Botafogo de Futebol e Regatas players
Campeonato Brasileiro Série A players
Association football defenders
Footballers from São Paulo